Steven Hydes (born 1986), sometimes known as Steve Hydes, was found as an abandoned baby at the south terminal of Gatwick airport in London on 10 April 1986 by a duty-free sales assistant, Beryl Wright.  Hydes was initially called Gary Gatwick after a plush toy bear sold in an airport giftshop that had been given to him by airport staff soon after his discovery.  His case was widely publicised in the UK and elsewhere at the time.  The baby was subsequently adopted and given the name Steven Hydes.

Despite extensive searching by Hydes and others for more than a quarter century little or no information had turned up about Hydes' origins. Hydes has been featured on several TV programmes and was the subject of a documentary produced by the BBC. In May 2019 Hydes announced on his Facebook page that through help from genetic genealogists he had found his birth family but his biological mother had already died. His biological father and his siblings were unaware of his existence.

Hydes resides in Sussex with his partner Sammy and children Alanna and Kian.

References

External links 
 Facebook Page
 

1986 births
Living people